Chuanqi ("strange tale", "legend", or "romance", depending on context) may refer to two related but distinct forms of Chinese fiction:

Chuanqi (short story), a genre of Chinese fiction usually associated with the Tang dynasty (618–907); the stories tend to be short
Chuanqi (theatre), a genre of Chinese opera usually associated with the Ming dynasty (1368–1644); the plays tend to be very long